Bernard "Tiger" Clark (born January 12, 1967) is an American football coach and former player. He is head football coach at Robert Morris University, a position he has held since the 2018 season. Clark played professionally as a linebacker in the National Football League (NFL) with the Cincinnati Bengals and the Seattle Seahawks. He played college football at the University of Miami in Coral Gables, Florida.

Early life and playing career
Clark, a 1985 graduate of A. P. Leto High School in Tampa, Florida, played middle linebacker while at the University of Miami from 1985 to 1989. He caught his big break in the 1988 Orange Bowl when he replaced a suspended George Mira Jr., where he had an outstanding game and was voted Orange Bowl MVP.

Clark was drafted in the third round in the 1990 NFL Draft by the Cincinnati Bengals. He played two seasons in the National Football League (NFL), from 1990 to 1991 with the Bengals and the Seattle Seahawks, and two with the Orlando Predators in the Arena Football League.

Coaching career
Clark began his coaching career at James Madison University, coaching defensive ends from 1998 to 1999. He then coached special teams and linebackers for three years (2000–2003) at Liberty University. In 2004, he became defensive coordinator for Florida International University (FIU). In 2006, Clark became the defensive line coach at the University of South Florida in his hometown of Tampa  for one season before returning to FIU as the defensive line coach in 2007.  In 2009, he became the defensive coordinator at Hampton University.  In February 2010, Clark left Hampton to join Dave Wannstedt's coaching staff as linebackers coach at the University of Pittsburgh. Wannstedt had coached Clark at Miami.

Head coaching record

References

External links
 Robert Morris profile
 

1967 births
Living people
American football linebackers
Albany Great Danes football coaches
Cincinnati Bengals players
Colorado State Rams football coaches
FIU Panthers football coaches
Hampton Pirates football coaches
James Madison Dukes football coaches
Liberty Flames football coaches
Miami Hurricanes football players
Pittsburgh Panthers football coaches
Robert Morris Colonials football coaches
Seattle Seahawks players
South Florida Bulls football coaches
Players of American football from Tampa, Florida
African-American coaches of American football
African-American players of American football